Mesochorinae  is a worldwide  subfamily of the parasitic wasp family Ichneumonidae. 
 
Mesochorinae  are koinobiont hyperparasitoids of ectoparasitic or endoparasitic Ichneumonoidea, and, less frequently, of Tachinidae (Diptera). There are 10 genera.

Genera
These genera belong to the subfamily Mesochorinae:
 Artherola Wahl, 1993 c g
 Astiphromma Förster, 1869 c g b
 Chineater Wahl, 1993 c g
 Cidaphus Förster, 1869 c g b
 Latilumbus Townes, 1971 c g
 Lepidura Townes, 1971 c g
 Mesochorus Gravenhorst, 1829 c g b
 Planochorus Schwenke, 2004 c g
 Thamester Wahl, 1993 c g
 Varnado Wahl, 1993 c g
Data sources: i = ITIS, c = Catalogue of Life, g = GBIF, b = Bugguide.net

References

Townes, H.K. (1971): Genera of Ichneumonidae, Part 4 (Cremastinae, Phrudinae, Tersilochinae, Ophioninae, Mesochorinae, Metopiinae, Anomalinae, Acaenitinae, Microleptinae, Orthopelmatinae, Collyriinae, Orthocentrinae, Diplazontinae). Memoirs of the American Entomological Institute 17: 1–372.

External links

 Diagnostic characters
 Waspweb

Ichneumonidae
Taxa named by Arnold Förster
Hymenoptera subfamilies
Hyperparasites